Presidential elections were held in Cape Verde on 7 August 2011, with a second round run-off on 21 August. The result was a victory for Jorge Carlos Fonseca of the Movement for Democracy, who received 54% of the vote in the second round.

Campaign
Four candidates contested the elections:
Manuel Inocêncio Sousa, a former Foreign Minister and the candidate of the ruling African Party for the Independence of Cape Verde (PAICV).
Aristides Lima, President of the National Assembly. A member of the PAICV, he ran without its support.
Jorge Carlos Fonseca, another former Foreign Minister, and the candidate of the opposition Movement for Democracy.
Joaquim Monteiro, an independent.

Results

References

Presidential elections in Cape Verde
Cape Verde
Presidential